Skodje Church is a parish church of the Church of Norway in Ålesund Municipality in Møre og Romsdal county, Norway. It is located in the village of Skodje. It is the church for the Skodje parish which is part of the Nordre Sunnmøre prosti (deanery) in the Diocese of Møre. The white, wooden church was built in a long church design in 1860 using plans drawn up by the architect Fritz Meinhardt. The church seats about 330 people.

History
The earliest existing historical records of the church date back to 1432, but the church was not new that year. The first church in Skodje was a wooden stave church that may have been built in 14th century. The church was originally a long church design, but some time during the early-1600s, the church was remodeled by adding a timber-framed transepts to the north and south sides of the nave which ultimately created a cruciform floor plan. In 1750 the old church was in such poor condition that it was torn down and a new timber-framed, cruciform church was built on the same site. In 1859 this church too was torn down, and the present church building was constructed. This new church was designed by Fritz Meinhardt and built by the builders Gjert Lien and Alias Tonning. The new church was consecrated in 1860.

See also
List of churches in Møre

References

Buildings and structures in Ålesund
Churches in Møre og Romsdal
Long churches in Norway
Wooden churches in Norway
19th-century Church of Norway church buildings
Churches completed in 1860
14th-century establishments in Norway